Yang Yung-wei (Paiwan language: Drangadrang; born 28 September 1997) is a Taiwanese Paiwan judoka. He is the current silver Olympic medalist in the Extra Lightweight event. He also won one of the bronze medals in the men's 60 kg event at the 2018 Asian Games held in Jakarta, Indonesia.

Career
Yang was born in Shizi, Pingtung, and raised in Taichung. He began practicing judo while attending primary school, during his third grade year. His mother and two other siblings also had judo experience. As a Shin Min High School student, Yang was coached by Lin Shih-hsuan.

In 2017, he competed at the Summer Universiade held in Taipei, Taiwan. In 2018, he won one of the bronze medals in the men's 60 kg event at the Asian Games held in Jakarta, Indonesia.

At the 2019 Asian-Pacific Judo Championships held in Fujairah, United Arab Emirates, he won the silver medal in the men's 60 kg event. In that same year, he also competed in the men's 60 kg event at the 2019 World Judo Championships held in Tokyo, Japan.

In 2020, he won the silver medal in the men's 60 kg event at the Judo Grand Slam Düsseldorf held in Düsseldorf, Germany. In 2021, he won the silver medal in his event at the Judo World Masters held in Doha, Qatar. A few months later, he won one of the bronze medals in his event at the 2021 Judo Grand Slam Antalya held in Antalya, Turkey.

Yang won the silver medal in the men's 60 kg event at the 2020 Summer Olympics held in Tokyo, Japan. He also became the first Taiwanese judoka to win a medal in judo at the Summer Olympics, as well as the first Taiwanese medalist of the 2020 Olympics.

At the 2021 Judo Grand Slam Abu Dhabi held in Abu Dhabi, United Arab Emirates, he won the gold medal in his event. He also won the gold medal in his event at the 2022 Judo Grand Slam Antalya held in Antalya, Turkey.

References

External links
 
 

Living people
1997 births
People from Pingtung County
Taiwanese male judoka
Competitors at the 2017 Summer Universiade
Judoka at the 2018 Asian Games
Asian Games bronze medalists for Chinese Taipei
Asian Games medalists in judo
Medalists at the 2018 Asian Games
Judoka at the 2020 Summer Olympics
Olympic judoka of Taiwan
Medalists at the 2020 Summer Olympics
Olympic silver medalists for Taiwan
Olympic medalists in judo
Paiwan people
Sportspeople from Taichung
21st-century Taiwanese people